Here Won No One is the first EP release by American electro-industrial band Finite Automata.  It was released on November 3, 2011 by Beyond Therapy Records in digital format and compact disc.

The EP's title is a play on the swine flu designation H1N1, The title track is heavily critical of the American healthcare system, in particular, for-profit healthcare. The EP was originally self recorded and released and then re-issued through the band's label Beyond Therapy Records. Although praised by many as a "throwback" to early electro-industrial music, it was criticized for its lack of production quality due to its self-released nature. Many of the tracks from this release would be later reworked on the band's follow-up full length Album Recurse.

Track listing

Personnel
Mod Eschar - Lyrics, Vocals, Arrangement, Sampler
c. Grendel - Keyboards, Sequencer, Composer
Mat Syn - Noises, Gadgetry

References 

2011 debut EPs
Finite Automata (band) albums